Bob McMillen may refer to:

 Bob McMillen (athlete) (born 1928), American middle-distance runner and steeplechaser
 Bob McMillen (American football) (born 1970), football player and coach